The 2020 CAF Confederation Cup Final was the final of the 2019–20 CAF Confederation Cup, the 17th edition of Africa's secondary club football tournament organized by the Confederation of African Football (CAF), under the current CAF Confederation Cup title after the merger of CAF Cup and African Cup Winners' Cup.

For the first time, the final was played as a single match at a venue pre-selected by CAF. It was originally scheduled to be played on 24 May 2020 at the Prince Moulay Abdellah Stadium in Rabat, Morocco. However, due to the COVID-19 pandemic, the match was postponed and was played on 25 October 2020, as part of a Final Four format played as single matches in Morocco.

RS Berkane defeated Pyramids and won 1–0, earning themselves their first ever CAF Confederation Cup and African trophy. They also earned the right to play against the 2019–20 CAF Champions League winners in the 2020–21 CAF Super Cup.

Teams

Venue

The CAF Executive Committee decided in June 2019 that the final would be played as a single match. One member association submitted bids during the period of 11–20 February 2020:

The CAF Emergency Committee made the final decision on 12 March 2020, and Prince Moulay Abdellah Stadium, Rabat was officially announced as the final venue on 16 March 2020.

Postponement
On 18 April 2020, the CAF announced that the final had been postponed until further notice due to the COVID-19 pandemic.

On 3 August 2020, the CAF announced that the final would be played on 27 September 2020.

On 10 September 2020, the CAF announced that at the request of the Royal Moroccan Football Federation, the final was rescheduled to 25 October 2020.

Road to the final

Note: In all results below, the score of the finalist is given first (H: home; A: away; N: neutral).

Format
The final is played as a single match at a pre-selected venue, with the winner of semi-final 1 according to the knockout stage draw designated as the "home" team for administrative purposes. If scores are level after full-time, extra time is not played and the winners are decided by a penalty shoot-out (Regulations Article III. 28).

Officials
On 24 October 2020, CAF named Cameroonian referee Sidi Alioum as the referee for the match. Alioum is a member of the CAF Elite and took charge of numerous important matches in competitions organized by CAF, including the 2019 Africa Cup of Nations final. His compatriot Elvis Guy Noupue was chosen as one of the assistant referees, along with Chadian official Issa Yaya, while Eric Otogo-Castane of Gabon was chosen as the fourth official. Zambian referee Janny Sikazwe was named the video assistant referee and was assisted by Haythem Guirat from Tunisia and Gerson Emiliano dos Santos from Angola.

Match

See also
2020 CAF Champions League Final
2020–21 CAF Super Cup

Notes

References

External links
Total CAF Confederation Cup, CAFonline.com
CAF Total Confederation Cup 2019/20

2020
Final
October 2020 sports events in Africa
Pyramids FC matches
RS Berkane matches
International club association football competitions hosted by Morocco
Association football events postponed due to the COVID-19 pandemic